The 2022 Texas A&M Aggies football team represented Texas A&M University in the 2022 NCAA Division I FBS football season. The Aggies played their home games at Kyle Field in College Station, Texas, and competed in the Western Division of the Southeastern Conference (SEC). They were led by fifth-year head coach Jimbo Fisher.

The Aggies finished the season 5–7, 2–6 in SEC play to finish last in the conference's West Division. This was the Aggies' first losing season since 2009 and the first season the program failed to qualify for a bowl game since 2008. On November 28, the university announced that offensive coordinator Darrell Dickey had been fired. The Aggies finished the season with the 12th ranked offense in the SEC and 101st in FBS, averaging 22.8 points per game.

Previous season
After finishing the regular season with an 8–4 record, the team accepted a bid to the Gator Bowl. On December 22, the Aggies withdrew from the bowl, citing a breakout of positive COVID-19 cases and season-ending injuries limiting them to too few players.

Offseason

Position key

Players departures

Outgoing transfers

† Elected to use the extra year of eligibility granted by the NCAA in response to COVID-19.

2022 NFL Draft 

The following Aggies players were selected in the NFL Draft.

Additions

Incoming Transfers

Recruiting Class

 

 

 
 

 

|}

*= 247Sports Composite rating; ratings are out of 1.00. (five stars= 1.00–.98, four stars= .97–.90, three stars= .80–.89, two stars= .79–.70, no stars= <70)
†= Despite being rated as a four and five star recruit by ESPN, On3.com , Rivals.com and 247Sports.com, TBA received a four star 247Sports Composite rating.
Δ= Left the Texas A&M program following signing but prior to the 2022 season.

Overall class rankings

Preseason

SEC media days
The 2022 SEC Media days were held in July 2022. The Preseason Polls were released in July 2022. Each team had their head coach available to talk to the media at the event. Coverage of the event was televised on SEC Network and ESPN.

Preseason All-SEC teams (media)

First Team

Second Team

Third Team

References:

Schedule
Texas A&M and the SEC announced the 2022 football schedule on September 21, 2021.

Personnel

Roster

Coaching staff

Game summaries

Sam Houston

Statistics

The game went into a weather delay during halftime that lasted for nearly three hours. The game was suspended around 1:00 p.m. when lightning was reported in the area before a heavy rain started to fall about an hour later. The game resumed at 3:54 p.m.

Appalachian State

Statistics

No. 13 Miami (FL)

Statistics

vs. No. 10 Arkansas

Statistics

at Mississippi State

Statistics

at No. 1 Alabama

Statistics

at South Carolina

Statistics

No. 15 Ole Miss

Statistics

Florida

Statistics

The Aggies suffered a flu outbreak earlier in the week, with several starters on offense and defense being ruled out.

at Auburn

Statistics

With the loss, the Aggies lost their sixth game in a row for the program's first six game losing streak since 1972. Additionally, the loss guaranteed the Aggies' first losing season since 2009.

UMass

Statistics

No. 5 LSU

Statistics

Rankings

Statistics

Scoring
Texas A&M vs Non-Conference Opponents

Texas A&M vs SEC Opponents

Texas A&M vs All Opponents

References

Texas AandM
Texas A&M Aggies football seasons
Texas AandM Aggies football